Louis-Alexandre Fabre (born 17 March 1955) is a French actor, mostly known for his role of Charles Frémont in the series Plus belle la vie.

Biography 

He was born in Tunisia where he lived until he was 10. As a child, at the time of the Tunisian Independence, his father had to go back to France, in Albi. Then the family moved to Marseille when Alexandre was 12. Then he settled in Neuilly-sur-Seine.

In Paris, he learnt acting as a young 20-year-old, then went back to Marseille where in played Ionesco, Racine, Molière, Dumas, and others: Toursky, Gymnase, la Criée. He also shot for TV and the cinema (French Connection 2 with Gene Hackman).

For almost ten years, he played his own shows (inspired from Rabelais, John Fante, Sony Labou Tansi...), in big cities but also in the Tunisian countryside, in Mauritania, Tchad, Congo-Brazzaville, Madagascar, Cameroun...). He plays Dom Juan of Molière in the 1993 Avignon Festival staged by Renata Ramos.

He spent 15 years living in Africa. In Brazzaville, he put on a musical with his daughter, aged 20. Then, he moved back to Marseille (his favourite city), where he currently lives.

In Paris, he still plays theater: (Offenbach, Edmond Rostand, Daniel Soulier, Agatha Christie...). In 2004, he auditioned for the role of Charles Frémont in France 3's famous series, Plus belle la vie.

Movies

Cinema 
1975: French Connection 2 (of John Frankenheimer) - Young Inspector
1976: Le Plein de super (of Alain Cavalier) - Jean-Loup
1980: Journal d'une maison de correction (of Georges Cachoux) - Le maniaque
1980: Retour à Marseille (of René Allio) - Un flic
1983: Cap canaille (of Juliet Berto) - Un homme de main
1984: Le Juge (of Philippe Lefebvre) - Equipe de Innocenti
2000: De l'histoire ancienne  (of Orso Miret) - Libraire 1
2001: Mon père, il m'a sauvé la vie (of José Giovanni) - Maître Moro Giafferi

Television 

1976: Les Lavandes et le réséda
1976: Le sanglier de Cassis
1976: Folies en miettes
1977: La Mer promise (de Jacques Ertaud) - Le lieutenant
1979: Roméo et Baucis (d'Hélène Misserly) - Georges
1979: Jean le Bleu (d'Hélène Martin)
1979: Le Roman du samedi, épisode : Le coffre et le revenant (de Roger Hanin)
1980: La Fortune des Rougon (d'Yves-André Hubert) - L'ami d'Antoine
1980: So long rêveuse (de Jacques Ordines)
1980: Les Dossiers éclatés : La Canne (de Jean-Pierre Gallo) - Le gendarme
1980: Trousse colline
1980: Thomas Gordon
1980: Le Carton rouge (d'Alain Quercy)
1980: L'Arrêt des cars
1980: La Fabrique, un conte de Noël (de Pascal Thomas)
1980: Mon cher Théo Van Gogh (de Max Gérard) - Gauguin
1981: La Chèvre d'or (de Jean Dasque) - Le gendarme
1981: Le Sang des Atrides (de Sam Itzkovitch)
1981: Le Fils père
1981: Ton vieil ami pierrot
1981: L'Abbé Faria
1981: L'inspecteur mène l'enquête (de Luc Godevais)
1981: Jeu de loi
1982: Délit de fuite (de Paul Seban)
1982: La Vie de Galilée (de Jacques Ordines)
1982: Le Secret des Andrônes (de Sam Itzkovitch)
1983: Microbidon (d'André Halimi)
1984: Insomnie de monsieur Plude (de Jean Dasque)
1991: Tête de pioche
1991: Les Cœurs brûlés (de Jean Sagols) - Veilleur de nuit
1998: L’Échappée - L'homme de la société
1998: Le Papa de Léa
1998: Le Monde à l'envers (de Charlotte Brandström)
2000: Aux frontières de la loi
2000: Sous le soleil - Startey
2001: Mon père, il m'a sauvé la vie
2002: Le juge est une femme (épisode : L'ami d'enfance) - Louis
2003: Le Coupable idéal
2003: Action justice : déclaré coupable
2003: Avocats et Associés (épisode : Le loup dans la bergerie) - Le juge Valas
2004-2015: Plus belle la vie - Charles Frémont
2005: Un coin d'azur (d'Heikkei Arekallio) - Le médecin militaire
2005: Le Proc, épisode : Le témoin - Sylvain Watteau
2007: L'Affaire Christian Ranucci : le Combat d'une mère (de Denys Granier-Deferre) - Roger Pommard
2009: Funky Documentary (documentary)

Short film
 2012 : À la recherche du droit de Virgile Bayle et Jason Roffé

References

1955 births
21st-century French male actors
Living people
French male film actors
French male television actors
20th-century French male actors
French male stage actors